Badara or Bădără may refer to:

Given name
 Badara Badji (born 1994), Senegalese footballer 
 Badara Diatta (born 1969), Senegalese football referee
 Badara Joof, Gambian politician and civil servant
 Badara Ndiaye (born 1986), Senegalese visual concept developer and fashion designer
 Badara Sarr (born 1994), Senegalese footballer
 Badara Sène (footballer) (born 1984), Senegalese footballer
 Badara Traore (born 1997), American football player

Surname
Gheorghe Bădără (born 1941), Romanian cyclist